Allport is a census-designated place, which is located in Morris Township, Clearfield County, in the state of Pennsylvania. 

As of the 2020 census, the population was 230.

Pennsylvania Route 53 passes through Allport, leading northeast  to Interstate 80, Exit 133 at Kylertown and south  to Philipsburg.

Demographics
Between the time of the 2010 and 2020 federal census counts, the population remained static at 230.

References

Census-designated places in Clearfield County, Pennsylvania
Census-designated places in Pennsylvania